The cubic foot (symbol ft3 or cu ft) is an imperial and US customary (non-metric) unit of volume, used in the United States and the United Kingdom. It is defined as the volume of a cube with sides of one foot in length.

At , a cubic foot of water weighs .

Conversions

Symbols and abbreviations 
The IEEE symbol for the cubic foot is ft3. The following abbreviations are used: cubicfeet, cubicfoot, cubicft, cufeet, cufoot, cuft, cu.ft, cuft, cbft, cb.ft, cbft, cbf, feet, foot, ft, feet/-3, foot/-3, ft/-3.

Larger multiples are in common usage in commerce and industry in the United States:

 CCF or HCF: Centum (Latin hundred) cubic feet; i.e., 
 Used in the billing of natural gas and water delivered to households.
 MCF: Mille (Latin thousand) cubic feet; i.e., 
 MMCF: Mille mille cubic feet; i.e., 
 MMCFD: MMCF per day; i.e., /d
 Used in the oil and gas industry.
 BCF or TMC: Billion or thousand million cubic feet; i.e., 
 TMC is usually used for referring to storage capacity and actual storage volume of storage dams.
 TCF: Trillion cubic feet; i.e., 
 Used in the oil and gas industry.

Cubic foot per second and related flow rates

The IEEE symbol for the cubic foot per second is ft3/s. The following other abbreviations are also sometimes used:
 ft3/sec
 cu ft/s
 cfs or CFS 
 cusec
 second-feet

The flow or discharge of rivers, i.e., the volume of water passing a location per unit of time, is commonly expressed in units of cubic feet per second or cubic metres per second.

Cusec is a unit of flow rate, used mostly in the United States in the context of water flow, particularly of rivers and canals.

Conversions: 1 ft3s−1 = 0.028316847 m3⋅s−1 = 28.316847 L⋅s−1 = 1.699 m3⋅min−1 = 1699 L⋅min−1

Cubic foot per minute 
The IEEE symbol for the cubic foot per minute is ft3/min. The following abbreviations are used:
 cu ft/min
 
 cfm or CFM 
 cfpm or CFPM

Cubic feet per minute is used to measure the amount of air that is being delivered, and is a common metric used for carburettors, pneumatic tools, and air-compressor systems.

Standard cubic foot 

A standard cubic foot (abbreviated scf) is a measure of quantity of gas, sometimes defined in terms of standard temperature and pressure as a cubic foot of volume at 60 degrees Fahrenheit and 14.7 pounds per square inch (PSI) of pressure.

See also 

 Board foot
 Conversion of units
 Cord (unit)
 Cube (arithmetic), cube root
 Cubic inch
 Cubic yard
 Orders of magnitude (volume) for a comparison with other volumes
 Orders of magnitude (one cubic millimetre to one cubic metre)
 Square foot
 Therm, a unit of natural gas approximately equal to 100 cubic feet
 Cubic metre per second

References

Units of volume
Imperial units
Customary units of measurement in the United States
Units of flow
Physical quantities

ja:フィート#立方フィート